Mechanical metamaterials are artificial structures with mechanical properties defined by their structure rather than their composition. They can be seen as a counterpart to the rather well-known family of optical metamaterials. They are often also termed elastodynamic metamaterials and include acoustic metamaterials as a special case of vanishing shear. Their mechanical properties can be designed to have values which cannot be found in nature.

Examples of mechanical metamaterials

Acoustic / phononic metamaterials 
Acoustic or phononic metamaterials can exhibit acoustic properties not found in nature, such as negative effective bulk modulus, negative effective mass density,  or double negativity. They find use in (mostly still purely scientific) applications like acoustic subwavelength imaging,  superlensing,  negative refraction   or transformation acoustics.

Materials with negative Poisson's ratio (auxetics) 
Poisson's ratio defines how a material expands (or contracts) transversely when being compressed longitudinally. While most natural materials have a positive Poisson's ratio (coinciding with our intuitive idea that by compressing a material it must expand in the orthogonal direction), a family of extreme materials known as auxetic materials can exhibit Poisson's ratios below zero. Examples of these can be found in nature, or fabricated, and often consist of a low-volume microstructure that grants the extreme properties to the bulk material. Simple designs of composites possessing negative Poisson's ratio (inverted hexagonal periodicity cell) were published in 1985. In addition, certain origami folds such as the Miura fold and, in general, zigzag-based folds are also known to exhibit negative Poisson's ratio.

Metamaterials with negative longitudinal and volumetric compressibility transitions 
In a closed thermodynamic system in equilibrium, both the longitudinal and volumetric compressibility  are necessarily non-negative because of stability constraints.   For this reason, when tensioned, ordinary materials expand along the direction of the applied force. It has been shown, however, that metamaterials can be designed to exhibit negative compressibility transitions, during which the material undergoes contraction when tensioned (or expansion when pressured). When subjected to isotropic stresses, these metamaterials also exhibit negative volumetric  compressibility transitions. 
In this class of metamaterials, the negative response is along the direction of the applied force, which distinguishes these materials from those that exhibit negative transversal response (such as in the study of negative Poisson's ratio).

Pentamode metamaterials or meta-fluids 

A pentamode metamaterial is an artificial three-dimensional structure which, despite being a solid, ideally behaves like a fluid. Thus, it has a finite bulk but vanishing shear modulus, or in other words it is hard to compress yet easy to deform. Speaking in a more mathematical way, pentamode metamaterials have an elasticity tensor with only one non-zero eigenvalue and five (penta) vanishing eigenvalues.

Pentamode structures have been proposed theoretically by Graeme Milton and Andrej Cherkaev in 1995   but have not been fabricated until early 2012.  According to theory, pentamode metamaterials can be used as the building blocks for materials with completely arbitrary elastic properties. Anisotropic versions of pentamode structures are a candidate for transformation elastodynamics and elastodynamic cloaking.

Cosserat and Micropolar Metamaterials 

Very often Cauchy elasticity is sufficient to describe the effective behavior of mechanical metamaterials. When the unit cells of typical metamaterials are not centrosymmetric it has been shown that an effective description using chiral micropolar elasticity (or Cosserat ) was required. Micropolar elasticity combines the coupling of translational and rotational degrees of freedom in the static case and shows an equivalent behavior to the optical activity.

Willis materials 
In 2006 Milton, Briane and Willis showed that the correct invariant form of linear elastodynamics is the local set of equations originally proposed by Willis in the late 1970s and early 1980s, to describe the elastodynamics of inhomogeneous materials. This includes the apparently unusual (in elastic materials) coupling between stress, strain and velocity and also between momentum, strain and velocity. Invariance of Navier's equations can occur under the transformation theory, but would require materials with non-symmetric stress, hence the interest in Cosserat materials noted above. An elastostatic cloak with polar material with a distribution
of body torque that breaks the stress symmetry was fabricated and successfully tested.

The theory was given further foundations in the paper by Norris and Shuvalov.
A mathematical theory of near cloaking for linear elasticity has been developed based on these papers.

Meta-tribomaterials 
Meta-tribomaterials  proposed in 2021 are a new class of multifunctional mechanical metamaterials with intrinsic sensing and energy harvesting functionalities. These material systems are composed of finely tailored and topologically different triboelectric microstructures. Meta-tribomaterials, a.k.a. self-aware composite mechanical metamaterials, can serve as nanogenerators and sensing media to directly collect information about its operating environment. They naturally inherit the enhanced mechanical properties offered by classical mechanical metamaterials. Under mechanical excitations, meta-tribomaterials generate electrical signals which can be used for active sensing and empowering sensors and embedded electronics.

Hyperelastic cloaking and invariance 
Another mechanism to achieve non-symmetric stress is to employ pre-stressed hyperelastic materials and the theory of "small on large", i.e. elastic wave propagation through pre-stressed nonlinear media. Two papers written in the Proceedings of the Royal Society A in 2012 established this principal of so-called hyperelastic cloaking and invariance  and have been employed in numerous ways since then in association with elastic wave cloaking and phononic media.

References 

Metamaterials